303rd Intelligence Squadron (303 IS) is an intelligence unit of the United States Air Force located at Osan AB, South Korea. Also known as "Skivvy Nine," the squadron is a tenant unit of the 51st Fighter Wing, although it is operationally a component of the 480th Intelligence Wing. Most Skivvy Nine operations occur in the Korean Combined Operations and Intelligence Center (KCOIC). Together with the 6th Intelligence Squadron, the 303rd Intelligence Squadron comprises Distributed Ground Station 3 (DGS-3), a component of the Air Force Distributed Common Ground System. Founded 22 November 1950, the 303rd Intelligence Squadron is one of the most historic units in the U.S. Air Force, providing timely cryptologic support since the Korean War.

Mission

History

Lineage
 Designated as the 6903rd Security Squadron and activated on 1 May 1970
 Redesignated 6903rd Electronic Security Squadron on 1 August 1979
 Redesignated 6903rd Electronic Security Group on 1 October 1981
 Redesignated  303rd Intelligence Squadron on 1 October 1993

Assignments
 Pacific Security Region, 1 May 1970
 Pacific Security Region (1 May 1970 – 30 September 1980)
 USAF Security Service (later Electronic Security Command), 31 Dec 1972
 Electronic Security, Pacific (later Pacific Electronic Security Division, 692nd Intelligence Wing, 692nd Intelligence Group, 692nd Information Operations Group, 692nd Intelligence Group), 30 September 1980
 694th Intelligence, Surveillance and Reconnaissance Group (30 September 1980 – Present)
 694th Intelligence Group (later 694th Intelligence, Surveillance, and Reconnaissance Group), 1 April 2008 – present

Stations
 Osan Air Base, Republic of Korea, 1 May 1970 – present

Awards
 Air Force Outstanding Unit Award with Combat "V" Device
 1 June 2002 – 31 May 2003
 Air Force Outstanding Unit Award

 1 May 1970 – 1 April 1971
 2 April 1971 – 1 April 1972
 1 January 1976 – 30 June 1977
 1 July 1978 – 30 June 1979
 1 July 1979 – 30 June 1981
 1 July 1991 – 30 June 1993
 1 October 1993 – 30 September 1994
 1 October 1994 – 30 September 1995
 1 October 1995 – 30 September 1996
 1 October 1997 – 30 September 1998
 1 October 1999 – 30 September 2000
 1 June 2001 – 31 May 2002
 1 June 2003 – 30 September 2004
 1 October 2004 – 31 May 2005
 1 June 2007 – 31 May 2009
 1 June 2009 – 31 May 2011

 Republic of Korea Presidential Unit Citation
 19 August 1972 – 20 August 1972

References
 Notes

Bibliography

External links
 Air Force Intelligence, Surveillance and Reconnaissance Agency

Intelligence squadrons of the United States Air Force